Hermann's tortoise (Testudo hermanni) is a species  of  tortoise. Two subspecies are known: the western Hermann's tortoise (T. h. hermanni ) and the eastern Hermann's tortoise (T. h. boettgeri ). Sometimes mentioned as a subspecies, T. h. peleponnesica is not yet confirmed to be genetically different from T. h. boettgeri.

Etymology
The specific epithet, hermanni, honors French naturalist Johann Hermann.

The subspecific name, boettgeri, honors German herpetologist Oskar Boettger.

Geographic range
Testudo hermanni can be found throughout southern Europe. The western population (T. h. hermanni) is found in eastern Spain, southern France, the Balearic islands, Corsica, Sardinia, Sicily, southern and central Italy (Tuscany). The eastern population (T. h. boettgeri ) is found in Serbia, Kosovo, North Macedonia, Romania, Bulgaria, Albania, Turkey and Greece, while T. h. hercegovinensis populates the coasts of Bosnia and Herzegovina, Croatia, and Montenegro.

The oldest known evidence for T. hermanni on Sardinia is a fossil from the early Pleistocene of Monte Tuttavista. However, molecular evidence suggests extant populations of both this species and Emys orbicularis on Sardinia were actually introduced in recent times.

Description and systematics
Hermann's tortoises are small to medium-sized tortoises from southern Europe. Young animals and some adults have attractive black and yellow-patterned carapaces, although the brightness may fade with age to a less distinct gray, straw, or yellow coloration. They have slightly hooked upper jaws and, like other tortoises, possess no teeth, just strong, horny beaks. Their scaly limbs are greyish to brown, with some yellow markings, and their tails bear a spur (a horny spike) at the tip. Adult males have particularly long and thick tails, and well-developed spurs, distinguishing them from females.

A specimen of this size may weigh .

In 2006, Hermann's tortoise was suggested to be moved to the genus Eurotestudo and to bring the subspecies to the rank of species (Eurotestudo hermanni and Eurotestudo boettgeri). Though some factors indicate this might be correct, the data at hand are not unequivocally in support and the relationships between Hermann's and the Russian tortoise among each other and to the other species placed in Testudo are not robustly determined. Hence, it seems doubtful that the new genus will be accepted for now. The elevation of the subspecies to full species was tentatively rejected under the biological species concept at least, as there still seems significant gene flow.

Of note, the rate of evolution as measured by mutations accumulating in the mtDNA differs markedly, with the eastern populations having evolved faster. This is apparently due to stronger fragmentation of the population on the mountainous Balkans during the last ice age. While this has no profound implications for taxonomy of this species, apart from suggesting that two other proposed subspecies are actually just local forms at present, it renders the use of molecular clocks in Testudo even more dubious and unreliable than they are for tortoises in general.

T. h. hermanni
The subspecies T. h. hermanni includes the former subspecies T. h. robertmertensi and has a number of local forms. It has a highly arched shell with an intensive coloration, with its yellow coloration making a strong contrast to the dark patches. The colors wash out somewhat in older animals, but the intense yellow is often maintained. The underside has two connected black bands along the central seam.

The coloration of the head ranges from dark green to yellowish, with isolated dark patches. A particular characteristic is a yellow fleck on the cheek found in most specimens, although not in all; T. h. robertmertensi is the name of a morph with very prominent cheek spots. Generally, the forelegs have no black pigmentation on their undersides. The base of the claws is often lightly colored. The tail in males is larger than in females and possesses a spike. Generally, the shell protecting the tail is divided. A few specimens can be found with undivided shells, similar to the Greek tortoise.

T. h. boettgeri
The subspecies T. h. hercegovinensis, known as the Dalmatian tortoise, (Balkans coast) and the local T. h. peloponnesica (southwestern Peloponnesus coast) are now included here; they constitute local forms that are not yet geographically or in other ways reproductively isolated and apparently, derive from relict populations of the last ice age. The eastern Hermann's tortoises also have arched, almost round carapaces, but some are notably flatter and more oblong. The coloration is brownish with a yellow or greenish hue and with isolated black flecks. The coloring tends to wash out quite strongly in older animals. The underside is almost always solid horn color and has separate black patches on either side of the central seam.

The head is brown to black, with fine scales. The forelegs similarly possess fine scales. The limbs generally have five claws, which are darkly colored at their base. The hind legs are noticeably thicker than the forelegs, almost plump. The particularly strong tail ends in a spike, which may be very large in older male specimens. Females have noticeably smaller tail spikes, which are slightly bent toward the body. They can vary in size, but don't grow a huge amount. Their age can be around 70-80 years.

Ecology
Early in the morning, the animals leave their nightly shelters, which are usually hollows protected by thick bushes or hedges, to bask in the sun and warm their bodies. They then roam about the Mediterranean meadows of their habitat in search of food. They determine which plants to eat by the sense of smell. In captivity, they eat a variety of wildflowers, however care must be taken regarding which are made available, as some flowers such as buttercups are toxic to them. 
Certain plants such as dandelion and kale are high in oxalic acid, which can build up over time causing renal failure, it is therefore important to carefully monitor their diet and give a varied selection of wildflower leaves. All pre prepared food pellets are bad for Hermann's tortoises, proving addictive, often resulting in unnatural growth rates and the refusal to eat natural foods. Certain foods may prove toxic despite the tortoises enjoyment of them, including legumes, tomatoes and cabbage.
The animals eat small amounts of fruits as supplementary nutrition, however this should only be given occasionally.

Around midday, the sun becomes too hot for the tortoises, so they return to their hiding places. They have a good sense of direction to enable them to return.  In the late afternoon, they leave their shelters again and return to feeding.

In late February, Hermann's tortoises emerge from under bushes or old rotting wood, where they spend the winter months hibernating, buried in a bed of dead leaves. Immediately after surfacing from their winter resting place, Hermann's tortoises commence courtship and mating. Courtship is a rough affair for the female, which is pursued, rammed, and bitten by the male, before being mounted. Aggression is also seen between rival males during the breeding season, which can result in ramming contests.

Most females lay more than one clutch each season. The pinkish-white eggs are incubated for around 90 days and, like many reptiles, the temperature at which the eggs are incubated determines the hatchlings sex. At 26 °C, only males will be produced, while at 30 °C, all the hatchlings will be female. Young Hermann's tortoises emerge just after the start of the heavy autumn rains in early September and spend the first four or five years of their lives within just a few metres of their nests. If the rains do not come, or if nesting took place late in the year, the eggs will still hatch, but the young will remain underground and not emerge until the following spring. Until the age of six or eight, when the hard shell becomes fully developed, the young tortoises are very vulnerable to predators and may fall prey to rats, badgers, magpies, foxes, wild boar, and many other animals. If they survive these threats, the longevity of Hermann's tortoises is around 30 years. One rare record of longevity is 31.7 years. Compared to other tortoises (e.g. Testudo graeca), the longevity might be underestimated and many sources are reporting they might live 90 years or more.

Hibernation
In nature, Hermann’s tortoises dig their nightly shelters out and spend the relatively mild Mediterranean winters there. During this time, their heart and breathing rates drop notably. Domestic animals can be kept in the basement in a roomy rodent-proof box with a thick layer of dry leaves. The temperature should be around 5 °C. As an alternative, the box can be stored in a refrigerator. For this method to be used, the refrigerator should be in regular day-to-day use, to permit air flow. During hibernation, the ambient temperature must not fall below zero. Full-grown specimens may sleep four to five months at a time.

Conservation
The species is included in Appendix II of the Convention on International Trade in Endangered Species (CITES) meaning international export/import requires CITES documentation to be obtained and presented to border authorities.

See also
 Mediterranean tortoise
 List of reptiles of Italy
 Jackson ratio

References

Sources

External links

 (1992). "Mitochondrial DNA evolution at a turtle's pace: evidence for low genetic variability and reduced microevolutionary rate in the Testudines". Mol. Biol. Evol. 9 (3): 457-473. PDF fulltext.
 (2006).  "Eurotestudo, a new genus for the species Testudo hermanni Gmelin, 1789 (Chelonii, Testudinidae)". Les Comptes rendus de l'Académie des sciences 5 (6): 803-811.  PDF fulltext. (in English with French abstract).
 (2005). "Environmentally caused dwarfism or a valid species - Is Testudo weissingeri Bour, 1996 a distinct evolutionary lineage? New evidence from mitochondrial and nuclear genomic markers". Mol. Phylogenet. Evol. 37 (2): 389–401.  PDF fulltext.
 (2006). "A rangewide phylogeography of Hermann's tortoise, Testudo hermanni (Reptilia: Testudines: Testudinidae): implications for taxonomy". Zool. Scripta 35 (5): 531-548.  PDF fulltext.
 (2005). "Mitochondrial haplotype diversity in the tortoise species Testudo graeca from North Africa and the Middle East". BMC Evol. Biol. 5: 29.  (HTML/PDF fulltext + supplementary material).

.
Guide to keeping Hermann's Tortoises.
Breeding Hermann's Tortoises.

Testudo (genus)
Turtles of Europe
Reptiles as pets
Species endangered by agricultural development
Species endangered by agricultural pollution
Species endangered by pollution
Species endangered by urbanization
Species endangered by fires
Species endangered by the pet trade
Species endangered by roadkill
Species endangered by tourism
Species endangered by disease
Species endangered by human consumption for medicinal or magical purposes
Tortoise, Hermann's
Tortoise, Hermann's
Reptiles described in 1789
Taxa named by Johann Friedrich Gmelin